Yūhei, Yuhei or Yuuhei is a masculine Japanese given name.

Possible writings
Yūhei can be written using many different combinations of kanji characters. Here are some examples:

勇平, "courage, flat/peace"
勇兵, "courage, soldier"
悠平, "calm, flat/peace"
悠兵, "calm, soldier"
雄平, "male, flat/peace"
雄兵, "male, soldier"
優平, "gentleness, flat/peace"
優兵, "gentleness, soldier"
祐平, "help, flat/peace"
佑兵, "help, soldier"
裕平, "abundant, flat/peace"
有平, "have, flat/peace"
友平, "friend, flat/peace"

The name can also be written in hiragana ゆうへい or katakana ユウヘイ.

Notable people with the name
, Japanese baseball player
 (born 1989), Japanese former baseball player
 (born 1985), Japanese footballer
 (born 1947), Japanese politician
Yuhei Sato (佐藤 優平, born 1990), Japanese footballer
, Japanese baseball player
 (born 1983), Japanese footballer

Japanese masculine given names